Thrinax is a genus in the palm family, native to the Caribbean. It is closely related to the genera Coccothrinax, Hemithrinax and Zombia. Flowers are small, bisexual and are borne on small stalks.

Taxonomy

In the first edition of Genera Palmarum (1987), Natalie Uhl and John Dransfield placed the genus Thrinax in subfamily Coryphoideae, tribe Corypheae and subtribe Thrinacinae. Subsequent phylogenetic analyses showed that the Old World and New World members of Thrinacinae are not closely related and as a consequence, Thrinax and related genera were transferred into their own tribe, Cryosophileae. In 2008, Leucothrinax morrisii (formerly T. morrisii) was split from Thrinax after phylogenetic studies showed that its inclusion in Thrinax would render that genus paraphyletic.

Species
Thrinax consists of three species.

References

 
Arecaceae genera
Trees of the Caribbean
Taxa named by Olof Swartz